Gevherhan Sultan ("Gem of the Khan";  1642 – 27 October 1694) was an Ottoman princess, daughter of Sultan Ibrahim (r. 1640 – 1648) and half-sister of Sultans Mehmed IV (r. 1648 – 1687), Suleiman II (r. 1687 – 1691) and Ahmed II (r. 1691 – 1695) of the Ottoman Empire.

Life
Born in 1642 as a daughter of Sultan Ibrahim "the Mad", Gevherhan Sultan was firstly married, at the age of just four, on 23 November 1646, to one of her father's favorites, Cafer Pasha. The expense of her dowry was covered by the Imperial Treasury at her father's behest. 

On the wedding day, the bride was taken to Halil Pasha Palace, situated at Hoca Pasha, which had been allocated to the couple, in a carriage, accompanied by regiments comprised by dignitaries.
According to some sources, Cafer Pasha didn't marry Gevherhan, but her aunt Atike Sultan.

Said palace was reaffirmed as Gevherhan's property, after the fall of Ibrahim, by the regime of her brother Sultan Mehmed IV.

She was secondly married to Çavuşzade Mehmed Pasha, at a date variously suggested to be, uncertain, as early as 1647 or 1653. He served twice as Grand Admiral, as Vizier and in various other capacities and died in 1681.

In 1672, she was among several figures of the harem to accompany her brother Sultan Mehmed in his Wallachian campaign against Kamianets-Podilskyi.

The princess apparently spent the years following Mehmed Pasha's death  at Edirne, – a place of increased interest for her brother Sultan Mehmed and his court – and was married thirdly, on 13 January 1692, at the age of fifty, to Helvacı Yusuf Pasha, Grand Admiral.  He would die in 1714., while Gevherhan died in 1694.

Death
By 1693, Gevherhan Sultan had been struck by illness and was resting at Edirne. She died there on 27 October 1694. Her corpse was brought to Constantinople for a funeral and interred at Şehzade Mosque.

Debts
Following Gevherhan Sultan's demise, the entirety of her wares and properties in Istanbul or Edirne – which included a palace, a yali (waterfront manse), a garden, a bakery, real estate like mills – was confiscated in favour of the imperial treasury.

The late princess is understood to have been in great debt, as is demonstrated by Topkapı Palace archives dating 28 November 1694, a substantial amount of which was owed to her brother Sultan Ahmed II’s consort Rabia Sultan.

Some of the debts mentioned were covered by the allocation of Gevherhan's grants from her hass, that is revenue-producing estates to Asiye Sultan, the infant daughter of  Ahmed and Rabia as shown in archives dating 1 December 1694. This has made some think that she may have been Ahmed II's full sister and therefore Muazzez Sultan's daughter.

See also
 List of Ottoman Princesses

Ancestry

References

Sources

 

 

1642 births
1694 deaths
17th-century Ottoman princesses